Family is the second album by indie band Le Loup. It was released on September 22, 2009.

Track listing
All songs credited to Le Loup

"Saddle Mountain" – 2:06
"Beach Town" – 4:13
"Grow" – 3:20
"Morning Song" – 4:41
"Family" – 4:10
"Forgive Me" – 5:02
"Go East" – 5:02
"Golden Bell" – 1:22
"Sherpa" – 5:30
"Neahkahnie" – 3:22
"A Celebration" – 7:53

Personnel 
Sam Simkoff – keyboard, banjo
Christian Ervin – computer
Michael Ferguson – guitar
Robert Sahm – drums
Jim Thomson – guitar

Blackberry Commercial 
The single "Morning Song" was used in 2010 BlackBerry Messenger (BBM) Television Commercials.

2009 albums
Le Loup albums